William E. Hurley was an American politician who served as Treasurer and Receiver-General of Massachusetts from 1937 to 1943. 

Hurley was the post master of Boston from 1918 to 1920 and from 1930 to 1935.

William E. Hurley defeated former Marlborough State Representative James M. Hurley in the 1936 election, succeeding Charles F. Hurley who had chosen to run for Governor instead of running for reelection. Because he was constitutionally limited to three, two year terms, William E. Hurley did not run for reelection in 1942 and was succeeded by former State Auditor Francis X. Hurley.

Notes

1875 births
State treasurers of Massachusetts
Massachusetts Republicans
Year of death missing